Sukhvor-e Shahbaz-e Najafi (also Romanized as Sūkhvor-e Shahbāz-e Najafī, Sūkhūr-e Shahbāz-e Najafī, and Sūkhvor Shahbāz Najafī) is a village in Heydariyeh Rural District, Govar District, Gilan-e Gharb County, Kermanshah Province, Iran. At the 2006 census, its population was 95, in 15 families.

References 

Populated places in Gilan-e Gharb County